Nigel Paul (born 27 June 1989) is a super heavyweight boxer from Trinidad and Tobago.

In 2015 he won the Trinidad & Tobago National Novice Championships and became 7th at the AMBC American Confederation Boxing Championships.

In 2016 he became 2nd at the American Qualification Event for the 2016 Olympic Summer Games and qualified for the Olympic boxing tournament.  Paul was beaten by Nigerian boxer Efe Ajagba at the Olympic boxing tournament on 13 August at the Rio games. Ajagba won the bout with a 7 second knockout of Paul.

In 2021 he competed at the World Championships, where he became the first boxer from his country, and the Caribbean, to win a world medal (bronze).

External links 
 
 
 
 
 

1989 births
Living people
Trinidad and Tobago male boxers
Olympic boxers of Trinidad and Tobago
Boxers at the 2016 Summer Olympics
AIBA World Boxing Championships medalists
Commonwealth Games competitors for Trinidad and Tobago
Boxers at the 2018 Commonwealth Games
Central American and Caribbean Games bronze medalists for Trinidad and Tobago
Competitors at the 2018 Central American and Caribbean Games
Pan American Games competitors for Trinidad and Tobago
Boxers at the 2019 Pan American Games
People from Chaguanas
Super-heavyweight boxers
Central American and Caribbean Games medalists in boxing
Boxers at the 2022 Commonwealth Games